Wheeling is a station on Metra's North Central Service in Wheeling, Illinois. In Metra's zone-based fare system, Wheeling is in zone F. As of 2018, Wheeling is the 134th busiest of Metra's 236 non-downtown stations, with an average of 348 weekday boardings.

As of December 12, 2022, Wheeling is served by all 14 trains (seven in each direction) on weekdays.

The station is located in an industrial development. Town Street ends at Wheeling Station as a cul-de-sac with parking in the middle of the U-Turn. Additional parking can be found on the opposite side of the intersection of Town Street and Wheeling Road, and across the tracks on Northgate Parkway south of Illinois Route 68.

Bus connections
Pace

  234 Wheeling/Des Plaines (weekdays only)

References

External links 

Station from Google Maps Street View

Metra stations in Illinois
Railway stations in Cook County, Illinois
Former Soo Line stations
Railway stations in the United States opened in 1996